Raj Kaur is an Indian professional archer. She won the bronze medal in the women's compound division at the 2019 World Archery Championships held from 10 June to 16 June in 2019 at 's-Hertogenbosch, Netherlands. The Indian women's compound team of Muskan Kirar, Jyothi Surekha Vennam, and Raj Kaur defeated Turkey by 229-226.

She has also participated in Asian Games.

Early life 
Raj Kaur lives in Amritsar, Punjab. She left Border Security Force and presently working as police constable in Punjab police. Her father Mr. Inderjeet is also working as constable in Punjab police.

See also 
 Indian Archers
 Muskan Kirar
 Jyothi Surekha Vennam

References 

Indian female archers
1991 births
Living people